This is a list of notable people from Westmorland County, New Brunswick. Although not everyone in this list was born in Westmorland County, they all live or have lived in Westmorland County and have had significant connections to the communities.

This article does not include People from Moncton or People from Dieppe as they have their own sections.

See also
List of people from New Brunswick

References

Westmorland